This article lists the largest companies in Israel in terms of their revenue, net profit, total assets and market capitalization according to the American business magazine Forbes.

2022 Forbes list 

This list is based on the Forbes Global 2000, which ranks the world's 2,000 largest publicly traded companies. The Forbes list takes into account of many factors, including the revenue, net profit, total assets and market value of each company; each factor is given a weighted rank in terms of importance when considering the overall ranking. The table below also lists the headquarters location and industry sector of each company. The figures are in billions of US dollars and are for the year 2022. All 13 companies from Israel are listed.

See also 

 List of companies of Israel
 List of largest companies by revenue

References 

Israel

companies